The  Kakrak Valley is a valley in the Jaghatu district of Ghazni province in Afghanistan.

Demographics 
Kakrak Valley is inhabited by ethnic Hazaras.

See also 
 Ghazni Province

References 

Jaghatū District
Valleys of Afghanistan
Hazarajat
Ghazni Province